This is a list of museums in Italy.

List of museums by city 

 Alfedena
 Museo civico aufidenate Antonio De Nino
 Amalfi
 Museo della Carta di Amalfi
 Diocesan Museum of Amalfi
 Ancona
 Museo Archeologico Nazionale
 Museo Omero
 Pinacoteca Civica "Francesco Podesti"
 Aquileia
 Museo Nazionale Paleocristiano
 National Archaeological Museum
 Arezzo
 Museo 'Ivan Bruschi'
 Ariano Irpino
 
 
 
 City Museum and Ceramics Gallery
 
 Ascoli Piceno
 Diocesan museum of Ascoli Piceno, Italy
 Atri
 Museo capitolare di Atri
 Avellino
 Museo Irpino
 Bari
 Museo di Castello Normanno Svevo
 Pinacoteca Provinciale di Bari
 Bassano del Grappa
 Poli Grappa Museum
 Benevento
 Janua Museo delle Streghe
 MUSA
 Museo Capitolare
 Museo d'Arte Contemporanea Sannio
 Museo del Sannio
 Palazzo Paolo V
 Rocca dei Rettori
 Santa Sofia's Church
 Museo Diocesano
 Museo Egizio di Benevento
 Bergamo
 Accademia Carrara
 Museo Matris Domini
 Museo di Scienze Naturali Enrico Caffi
 Bologna
 Archeological Museum of Bologna
 Biblioteca comunale dell'Archiginnasio
 Collezioni Comunali d'Arte
 Ducati Museum
 Museo Civico Medievale
 Museo d'Arte Moderna di Bologna
 Museo Morandi
 Museo Ebraico di Bologna
 Pinacoteca Nazionale di Bologna with an extra collection in Palazzo Pepoli Campogrande
 Museo di Palazzo Poggi
 Bolzano
 Museo Archeologico dell'Alto Adige
 Brescia
 Civica Raccolta del Disegno di Salò
 National Museum of Photography
 The Mille Miglia Museum
 Museo di Santa Giulia
 Pinacoteca Tosio Martinengo
 Diocesan Museum of Brescia
 Scavi archeologici di Palazzo Martinengo Cesaresco Novarino
 Brentonico
 Museo del Fossile del Monte Baldo
 Cagliari
 Museo di Bonaria
 Museo di Fisica di Sardegna
 Pinacoteca Nazionale di Cagliari
 Sardinian Archaeological Museum
 Caltanissetta
 Museo archeologico regionale di Caltanissetta
 Museo diocesano di Caltanissetta
 Museo mineralogico di Caltanissetta
 Museo Tripisciano
 Campli
 Museo Archeologico Nazionale di Campli
 Capua
 Museo Campano
 Caserta
 Caserta Palace
 Museo della Seta
 Museo Michelangelo
 Castel di Sangro
 Museo civico aufidenate
 Castelfidardo
 Museo del Risorgimento
 Catania
 Museo Civico Belliniano
 Celano
 Museo Paludi di Celano
 Museo d'Arte Sacra della Marsica
 Cerchio
 Museo civico di Cerchio
 Cesena
 Museum of Malatestiana Library
 Museum of Rocca Malatestiana
 Galleria dei dipinti antichi della Fondazione Cassa di Risparmio di Cesena
 Museo archeologico di Cesena
 Museo della Centuriazione
 Museo di scienze naturali di Cesena
 Museo di storia dell'agricoltura
 Pinacoteca Comunale di Cesena
 Chianciano
 Chianciano Museum of art
 Chieti
 Museo Archeologico Nazionale d'Abruzzo
 Cividale del Friuli
 National Archaeological Museum of Cividale del Friuli
 Como
 Museo Archeologico "Paolo Giovio"
 Museo Liceo Classico 'A. Volta' 
 Tempio Voltiano
 Villa Olmo
 Corfinio
 Museo civico archeologico Antonio De Nino

 Crema
 Civic Museum of Crema
 Cremona
 Museo Civico Ala Ponzone
 Fabriano
 Paper and Watermark Museum Fabriano
 Ferrara
 Museo Civico di Storia Naturale di Ferrara
 Museo Nazionale di Spina
 Museo dell'Ottocento
 Museo Riminaldi
 Pinacoteca Nazionale
 Museum of Italian Judaism and the Shoah

 Florence
 Accademia di Belle Arti Firenze
 Bargello
 Casa Buonarroti
 Casa Guidi
 Cenacoli di Firenze
 Galleria dell'Accademia
Museum of Musical Instruments
 Galleria degli Uffizi
 Institute and Museum of the History of Science
 La Specola
 Museo dell'Opera del Duomo
 Museo Archeologico Etrusco
 Museo Bardini
 Museo del Calcio
 Museo Nazionale Alinari della Fotografia
 Museo Nazionale di San Marco
 Museo di Storia Naturale di Firenze
 Museo Ideale Leonardo da Vinci
 National Archaeological Museum
 Opificio delle pietre dure
 Palazzo Pitti
Galleria Palatina
Gallery of Modern Art
Royal Apartments
Silver Museum
Costume Gallery
Carriages Museum
Carriages Museum
Boboli Gardens
 Palazzo Vecchio
 Vasari Corridor
 Museo Stibbert
 Museo Horne
 Museo Marino Marini
 Museo Ebraico
 Gino Bartali Museum
 Museo Salvatore Ferragamo
 Bellini Museum
 Palazzo Strozzi
 Palazzo Medici Riccardi
 Ospedale degli Innocenti
 Museum of Bigallo
 Cappelle Medicee
 Gaeta
 Mausoleum of Licius Munatius Plancus
 Gallipoli, Apulia
 Diocesan Museum of Gallipoli (Italy)
 Genoa
 Castello d'Albertis
 Galleria di Palazzo Bianco (Genoa)
 Galleria di Palazzo Rosso
 Museo Civico di Storia Naturale Giacomo Doria
 Museo di Palazzo Reale
 Museo d'Arte Orientale Edoardo Chiossone
 Palazzo Spinola
 Grosseto
 Museo di storia naturale della Maremma
 Museo archeologico e d'arte della Maremma
 Museo Collezione Gianfranco Luzzetti
 Guardiagrele
 Museo del duomo di Guardiagrele
 Imola
 Museo di Palazzo Tozzoni
 La Spezia
 Museo Civico "Amadeo Lia"
 Museo Nazionale dei Trasporti
 Museo Tecnico Navale
 L'Aquila
 Museo Archeologico di S. Maria dei Raccomandati
 Museo Nazionale d'Abruzzo
 Latina
 Galleria Civica d'Arte Moderna e Contemporanea di Latina
 Lanciano
 Museo diocesano di Lanciano
 Livorno
 Museo Mascagnano
 Museo di Storia Naturale del Mediterraneo
 Lucca
 Museo Nazionale Guinigi
 Museo Nazionale di Palazzo Mansi
 Museo e Pinacoteca Nazionale
 Macerata
 Museo di Palazzo Ricci
 Museo delle Carrozze
 Mantua
Museo di Palazzo Ducale 
Museo di Palazzo Te
 Matera
 Museo Nazionale d'Arte Medievale e Moderna della Basilicata
 Melfi
 Museo Nazionale del Melfese
 Merano
 Palais Mamming Museum
 Messina
 Musei, Gallerie e Aree Archeologiche 
 Museo Regionale di Messina
 Museo d’Arte Contemporanea Capo d’Orlando
 Milan

 Archaeological Museum (Milan)
 Bagatti Valsecchi Museum
 Biblioteca Ambrosiana
 Casa del Manzoni
 Civic Aquarium of Milan
 Sforza Castle museum complex
 Egyptian Museum
 Museum of Musical Instruments
 The Museum of Ancient Art
 Sforza Castle Pinacoteca
 Applied Arts Collection
 Furniture & Wooden Sculpture Museum
 Galleria d'Arte Moderna
 Natural History Museum of Milan
 Museo Diocesano di Milano
 Gallerie di Piazza Scala
 Museo Poldi Pezzoli
 Museum of the Twentieth Century
 Museo del Risorgimento
 Museo della Scienza e della Tecnologia Leonardo da Vinci
 Padiglione d'Arte Contemporanea
 Museo Storico Alfa Romeo
 Museo Teatrale alla Scala
 Pinacoteca di Brera
 Triennale di Milano
 Modena
 State museum gallery of Modena, Palazzo dei Musei
 Archaeological & Ethnological Museum
 Galleria Estense
 Museo Este Headstones
 Montefortino
 Pinacoteca Civica Fortunato Duranti
 Montesarchio
 Castello di Montesarchio
 Montopoli di Sabina
 Modern Automata Museum
 Monza
 Museo Serpero
 Naples
 Cappella Sansevero
 Certosa di San Martino
 Citta della Scienza
 Coral Jewellery Museum
 Museo Archeologico Nazionale Napoli
 Museo Civico Filangieri
 Museo delle Ferrovie
 Museo di Capodimonte
 Museo di Palazzo Reale
 Museo Mustilli
 Museo del Tesoro di San Gennaro
 Museo Pignatelli
 National Museum of Ceramics
 Palazzo delle Arti di Napoli
 Palazzo Zevallos Stigliano
 Pietrarsa railway museum
 Pinacoteca di Napoli
 Secret Museum, Naples
 Villa Floridiana
 Zoological Museum of Naples
 Orvieto
 Museo Archeologico di Orvieto
 Museo dell'Opera del Duomo di Orvieto
 Padua
 Diocesan Museum of Padua
 Musei Civici di Padova
 Nuovi Musei di Palazzo Zuckerman 
 Palermo
 Regional Archeological Museum Antonio Salinas
 Museo Diocesano
 Museo Palazzo Steri
 Zisa
 Palestrina
 Museo Archeologico Nazionale
 Palmi
 Casa della cultura museum complex:
 Museo etnografico "Raffaele Corso"
 Antiquarium "Nicola De Rosa"
 Museo musicale "Francesco Cilea e Nicola Manfroce"
 Gipsoteca "Michele Guerrisi"
 Pinacoteca "Leonida ed Albertina Repaci"
 Tempio di San Fantino
 Villa Repaci
 Parma
 Fondazione Magnani-Rocca
 Galleria Nazionale
 Museum House of Arturo Toscanini
 Museo Lombardi
 Pinacoteca Stuard
 Pavia
 Museo Civico, Pavia, including Pinacoteca Malaspina
 University History Museum, University of Pavia
 Pergola
 Museo dei Bronzi Dorati
 Perugia
 Galleria Nazionale dell'Umbria
 National Museum of Umbrian Archaeology
 Post Science Center
 Pesaro
 Museo Oliveriano
 Civic Museum of Palazzo Mosca
 Villa Imperiale of Pesaro
 Pescara
 Museo delle Genti d'Abruzzo
 Museo d'Arte Moderna Vittoria Colonna
 Birthplace of Gabriele D'Annunzio Museum
 Museo Paparella Treccia Devlet
 Piacenza
 Musei Civici
 Museum of National History
 Galleria Ricci
 Piemonte
 Museo Regionale di Scienze Naturali Regione Piemonte
 Pisa
 Camposanto Monumentale
 Certosa di Pisa
 Museo Nazionale di Palazzo Reale
 Museo Nazionale di San Matteo
 Museo Nazionale degli Strumenti per il Calcolo
 Museo dell'Opera del Duomo
 Museo delle Sinopie
 Museo di Storia Naturale e del Territorio dell'Università
 Museo storia naturale di Pisa
 Popoli
 Taverna ducale
 Poppi
 Museo e Arboreto Carlo Siemoni, Poppi
 Possagno
 Gypsotheca e Museo Antonio Canova
 Potenza
 Museo Archeologico Nazionale
 Museo Archeologico Provinciale
 Pozzuoli
 Campi Flegrei
 Museo Diocesano di Pozzuoli
 Prato
 Cathedral museum of Prato
 Centro per l'arte contemporanea Luigi Pecci
 Galleria di Palazzo degli Alberti
 Museo della Deportazione
 Predazzo
 Museo Geologico - Predazzo
 Priverno
 Giardino di Archimede
 Quarto d'Altino
 National Archaeological Museum of Altino
 Ravenna
 Archiepiscopal Museum, Ravenna
 Museo d'Arte della Città di Ravenna
 Museo Nazionale di Ravenna
 Reggio Calabria
 Museo Nazionale della Magna Grecia
 Museo dello Strumento Musicale
 Pinacoteca Comunale
 Rimini
 Museo della Città
 National Motorcycle Museum
 Rome

 Capitoline Museums
 Castel Sant'Angelo
 Centrale Montemartini
 Doria Pamphilj Gallery
 Enrico Fermi Center
 Forum Antiquarium
 Galleria Borghese
 Galleria Colonna
 Galleria Nazionale d'Arte Antica
 Gallery of St. Luke Academy
 Geological Museum Rome
 Keats-Shelley Memorial House
 Mausoleum of Augustus
 Mercati di Trajan
Monument to Vittorio Emanuele II
 Museo dell'Alto Medioevo
 Museo dell'Ara Pacis
 Museo dell'Arte Classica
 Museo d'Arte Contemporanea
 Museo Atelier Canova Tadolini
 Museo dei Bambini
 Museo Barracco di Scultura Antica
 Museo Carlo Bilotti
 Museo Civico di Zoologia
 Museo del Corso
 Museo Ebraico
 Museo della Mura
 Museo Napoleonico
 Museo nazionale del Palazzo di Venezia 
 Museo delle Origini
 Museo Pietro Canonica
 Museo del Risorgimento
 Museo di Roma a Palazzo Braschi
 Museo di Roma in Trastevere
 Museo Storico della Liberazione
 Museo del Vicino Oriente
 Museum of Roman Civilization
 National Etruscan Museum 
 National Gallery of Modern Art 
 National Museum of Oriental Art
 National Museum of Pasta Foods
 Museo Nazionale Romano – A set of national museums in Rome; four branches across the city
 Baths of Diocletian
 Crypta Balbi
 Palazzo Altemps
 Palazzo Massimi alle Terme
 Pigorini National Museum of Prehistory and Ethnography
 Pontifical Museum of Christian Antiquities
 Porta San Paolo
 Spada Gallery
 Torlonia Museum
 Vatican Museums
 Villa Farnesina
 Villa di Massenzio
 Rovereto
 Museo Civico Rovereto
 Salerno
 Museo Archeologico Provinciale
 Museo Didattico della Acuola Medica Salernitana
 Museo Diocesano di Salerno
 Museo Provinciale della Ceramica
 Pinacoteca Provinciale
 Saltara
 Museo del Bali
 Saronno
 Museo Giuseppe Gianetti
 Museo delle Industrie e del Lavoro del Saronnese
 Sassari
 Museo del Banco di Sardegna e Banca di Sassari
 Scapoli
 Museo della Zampogna
 Selva di Cadore
 Museo Paleontologico e Archeologico Vittorino Cazzetta
 Siena
 Museo dell'Opera Metropolitana del Duomo
 Pinacoteca Nazionale di Siena
 Siracusa
 Museo Archeologico Regionale Paolo Orsi
 Museo di Palazzo Bellomo
Sulmona
Museo diocesano di Sulmona
Teramo
Museo Civico di Teramo
Museo archeologico Francesco Savini
Toblach
Composers hut of Gustav Mahler
Torgiano
Museo dell'olivo e dell'olio
Museo del vino (Torgiano)
 Trapani
 Museo Regionale Agostino Pepoli
 Trento
 Castello del Buonconsiglio
 Museo Storico in Trento
 Museo dell'Aeronautica Gianni Caproni
 Museo Tridentino di Scienze Naturali
 Trieste
 Acquario Marino della Città di Trieste
 Civico Museo di Storia Naturale di Trieste
 Civico Museo Ferroviario di Trieste Campo Marzio
 Civico Museo Morpurgo
 Civico Museo Revoltella
 Civico Museo Sartorio
 Galleria Nazionale d'Arte Antica
 Immaginario Scientifico
 Museo del Mare
 Risiera di San Sabba
 Turin
 Holy Shroud History Museum
 Municipal Gallery of Modern and Contemporary Art
 Museo Egizio
 Museo Nazionale dell'Automobile
 Museo Nazionale della Montagna
 Museum of Oriental Art
 Museum of the Risorgimento
 National Museum of Cinema (Mole Antonelliana)
 Pinacoteca Giovanni e Marella Agnelli
 Sabauda Gallery
 Turin City Museum of Ancient Art
 Turin Museum of Natural History
 MACAM Museum, Maglione
 Urbino
 Galleria Nazionale delle Marche
 Venice 
 Biblioteca Nazionale Marciana
 Ca' d'Oro
 Ca' Pesaro
 Ca' Rezzonico
 Gallerie dell'Accademia
 Museo Correr
 Museo Fortuny
 Museo di Storia Naturale di Venezia
 Museo del Vetro in Murano
 Museum of Erotic Art
 Museum of Palazzo Ducale
 
 National Museum of Archaeology
 Palazzo Grassi
 Peggy Guggenheim Collection
 Pinacoteca Querini Stampalia
 Vercelli
 Museo Borgogna
 Museo Camillo Leone
 Museo del Tesoro del Duomo
 Verona
 Castelvecchio Museum
 Galleria d'Arte Moderna Palazzo Forti
 Musei Africano
 Natural History Museum
 Vicenza
 Galleria di Palazzo Leoni Montanari
 Musei Civici Vicenza
 Pinacoteca Civica
 Viterbo
 Museo Civico
 National Archaeological Museum of Viterbo at Rocca Albornoz
  Volterra
 Guarnacci Etruscan Museum
 Pinacoteca e Museo Civico di Voltera
  Vatican City
 Vatican Museums

List of museums by regions 

North-West
 Aosta Valley
 Liguria
 Lombardy
 Piedmont

North-East
 Emilia-Romagna
 Friuli Venezia Giulia
 Trentino-Alto Adige/Südtirol
 Veneto

Centre
 Lazio
 Marche
 Tuscany
 Umbria

South
 Abruzzo
 Apulia
 Basilicata
 Calabria
 Campania
 Molise

Islands
 Sardinia
 Sicily

References

External links 
 Musei Italiani
 Museums in Italy
 Virtual Library museums pages — Italy
 Musei Online

 

Museums